This is a list of episodes from the reality television series Couples Therapy, which aired on the cable network VH1.

Series overview

Episodes

Season 1

Season 2

Season 3

Season 4

Season 5

Season 6

Specials

References

External links
 
 

Lists of American non-fiction television series episodes